WMAA-LP (93.7 FM, Red 93.7) is a radio station broadcasting a Contemporary Christian format. Licensed to Moca, Puerto Rico, the station serves the western Puerto Rico area. The station is currently owned by Behind The Sound Corporation, and features programming from Red Informativa de Puerto Rico.

External links

Radio stations established in 2016
2016 establishments in the United States
MAA-LP
Moca, Puerto Rico